Kuttanellur Heliport is a Government of Kerala owned heliport located in Kuttanellur, in Thrissur city of Kerala, India. The Heliport can be used by giving advance notice to Government of Kerala or by special permission.

The heliport is situated at Sri C. Achutha Menon Government College, a government-owned college near Ollur. There are two landing ports available at the heliport. The heliport usually witnesses VVIP movements like Prime Minister or President or any ministers visiting Thrissur City or Guruvayur Temple.

References 

Aviation in India
Heliports in India
Transport in Thrissur